Peppe Lanzetta (born 6 February 1956) is an Italian actor. He appeared in more than twenty films since 1985.

Filmography

References

External links 

1956 births
Living people
Italian male film actors